Pionerskaya is a station of the Saint Petersburg Metro. Opened on 4 November 1982.

External links

Saint Petersburg Metro stations
Railway stations in Russia opened in 1982
1982 establishments in the Soviet Union
Railway stations located underground in Russia